Since 2001, the Los Angeles Rebellion Rugby union Football Club is the first rugby union club in Southern California that deliberately welcomes players, coaches and supporters of all ages, races, genders and sexual orientations.

The Rebellion RFC is a member of IGRAB: The International Gay Rugby Association and Board, also SCRFU: Southern California Rugby Football Union, USA Rugby, and IRB: the International Rugby Board.

References

External links 
 
 Article about the Rebellion in Frontiers Magazine
 Southern California Rugby Football Union

International Gay Rugby member clubs
Rebellion
2001 establishments in California
Rugby clubs established in 2001